Storm Adrian (also known as Vaia) was an intense Mediterranean storm which brought severe conditions to Northern Italy and surrounding regions. it was one of the costliest of the 2018-19 named storms, causing £2.9 billion (≥ €3.3 billion) in damages. It formed over the western Mediterranean Sea on October 28, becoming the sixth named storm of the season and the first named storm of the season for Météo-France. The storm made landfall along the French Riviera later that day, bringing high winds, heavy rain, thunderstorms and a severe storm surge along the south coast of France, causing coastal erosion in Nice. The storm's weather front brought similar problems to northern Italy and the Adriatic coast. Throughout Italy, 11 fatalities were reported. The storm damaged the Basilica of San Marco and left 75% of Venice underwater, but it also caused devastating damage to the Alpine forests south of the Dolomites. The wintry weather cut power to 200,000+ and resulted in traffic chaos.

References 

European windstorms
2018 meteorology